Charlotte Susan Jane Dujardin  (born 13 July 1985) is a British dressage rider, equestrian and writer. A multiple World and Olympic champion, Dujardin has been described as the dominant dressage rider of her era. She held the complete set of available individual elite dressage titles at one point: the individual Olympic freestyle, World freestyle and Grand Prix Special, World Cup individual dressage and European freestyle, and Grand Prix Special titles. Dujardin was the first rider to hold this complete set of titles at the same time.

With six Olympic medals, including three gold medals, Dujardin is Britain's joint most decorated female Olympian of all time with, and  second most successful female Olympian of all time behind, Laura Kenny.

Early life
Born in Enfield, Dujardin was brought up in Leighton Buzzard, Bedfordshire, where she attended Vandyke Upper School. She started riding as a two-year-old, returning her elder sisters' horses from the show jumping ring to the horse trailer. Aged three, she achieved second place at her first Pony Club show jumping competition. To finance their hobby, their mother Jane Dujardin bought and sold ponies for her daughters to ride to enable them to continue riding.

Leaving school aged 16, Dujardin won the Horse of the Year Show competition four times and was a winner at All England Jumping Course at Hickstead on three occasions. As a child Dujardin was diagnosed with dyslexia.

Career

After encouragement from her trainer Debbie Thomas, Dujardin took up dressage with a horse bought from an inheritance from her grandmother. In February 2007, after she sought employment with Carl Hester, he gave her some coaching. Spotting her talent, he offered her a job as a groom at his yard in Newent, Gloucestershire, where she has since remained. Dujardin's owned-horse is Fernandez.

In 2011, Dujardin was asked by Hester and co-owner Roly Luard to develop the novice Dutch Warmblood gelding Valegro, with the intention of that horse being ridden by Hester. However, Dujardin competed on Valegro in their first dressage Grand Prix event in 2011, the combination became part of the successful team which won gold in a European Dressage Championship event at Rotterdam. The pair then won the FEI World Cup Grand Prix at London Olympia in 2011, setting a new World Record for the Olympic Grand Prix special discipline by point-scoring at 88.022%, in April 2012.

In December 2012 Dujardin, again riding Valegro, won the 2012 World Cup freestyle event held at Olympia, with a score of 87.875%. On 19 April 2015 in Las Vegas, Dujardin and Valegro won the FEI World Cup with a score of 94.169% on the final day of competition.  This was their fourth consecutive World Title; they are the only competition pair to have ever held four consecutive world titles.

Olympics

Dujardin and Valegro were among the rider/horse pairs selected to represent Great Britain at the 2012 Summer Olympics, In the first round this dressage team set a new Olympic Record of 83.784%. On 7 August 2012 the pair were members of the British team which won the gold medal in the team dressage event. Two days later, in a routine accompanied by music which included Land of Hope and Glory, The Great Escape and the chimes of Big Ben; the pair won the gold medal in the individual dressage event, with a score of 90.089%.

Dujardin and Valegro also won double individual gold medals at the 2016 Rio Olympics, making her the first British woman to retain an individual Olympic title. With three gold medals and a silver, Dujardin was briefly the most successful female British Olympian in the history of the Games before cyclist Laura Trott surpassed her record with a fourth gold. Dujardin and Valegro set a new Olympic dressage score of 93.857 in the Grand Prix Freestyle.

On 14 December 2016, Dujardin retired Valegro at age 14 after completing a freestyle test at the Olympia London International Horse Show. The event was televised live on the BBC. Valegro's final performance was followed by tributes from Carl Hester, Valegro's owner and Dujardin's trainer, and Alan Davies, Valegro's groom. Dujardin and Hester decided after the 2016 Summer Olympics that Valegro had done everything that he could have after winning 3 Olympic Gold medals (2 individual & 1 team), 1 Silver team gold, and numerous world titles with Dujardin, and wanted to let him end his career on a high note. "I wanted to retire him on a high note, because he owes me absolutely nothing", Dujardin said after an interview with the BBC.

International Championship results

Honours
Dujardin was appointed Officer of the Order of the British Empire (OBE) in the 2013 New Year Honours and Commander of the Order of the British Empire (CBE) in the 2017 New Year Honours, both for services to equestrianism.

Dujardin has a modern strip of public housing named after her in Enfield.

Personal life
Her then-fiance Dean Golding wore a shirt bearing the proposal "Can we get married now?" after she won the gold medal at the Rio Olympics. 

In 2022, Dujardin announced she was pregnant with her first child. Her daughter, Isabella Rose, was born on 6 March 2023.

Writing and television
She guest-starred on the Netflix show Free Rein.

See also
 2012 Summer Olympics and Paralympics gold post boxes

References

External links
 
 Charlotte Dujardin
 
 
 

Living people
1985 births
English female equestrians
British dressage riders
Olympic equestrians of Great Britain
British female equestrians
Sportspeople from London
People from Enfield, London
Equestrians at the 2012 Summer Olympics
Equestrians at the 2016 Summer Olympics
Equestrians at the 2020 Summer Olympics
English Olympic medallists
Olympic gold medallists for Great Britain
Olympic silver medallists for Great Britain
Olympic bronze medallists for Great Britain
Olympic medalists in equestrian
Commanders of the Order of the British Empire
Medalists at the 2012 Summer Olympics
Medalists at the 2016 Summer Olympics
Medalists at the 2020 Summer Olympics
The Sunday Times Sportswoman of the Year winners
British women writers
British memoirists